Oakley is a given name of English origin that is a transferred use of an English place name and surname.

History
The name has increased in popularity as a given name for both boys and girls in the United States in recent years. It has ranked among the top 1,000 names given to newborn boys there since 2011 and for girls since 2013. It ranked among the top 200 names for girls in 2021 and among the top 500 names for boys in 2021. Spelling variations Oaklea, Oaklee, Oaklei, Oakleigh, Oakli, Oaklie, and Oakliegh and variants Oaklan, Oaklen, Oaklin, Oaklinn, Oaklyn, and Oaklynn are also in regular use.

People
Oakley Hoopes Bailey (1843–1947), prolific panoramic map creator
Central Cee, stage name of Oakley Neil H T Caesar-Su (born 1998), British rapper
Oakley C. Collins (1916–1994), American politician
Oakley C. Curtis (1865–1924), American politician and 50th governor of Maine
Oakley Haldeman (1909–1986), American songwriter ("Here Comes Santa Claus"), composer, author and the general manager for a music publisher
Oakley Hall (1920–2008), American novelist
Oakley C. Johnson (1890–1976), American socialist political activist and writer
Oakley G. Kelly (1891–1966), American record setting pilot for the United States Army Air Service
 T. J. Oakley Rhinelander (1858–1946), American heir and real estate magnate who was prominent in New York Society during the Gilded Age
George Oakley Totten Jr. (1866–1939), one of Washington D.C.’s most prolific and skilled architects in the Gilded Age

See also
Oakley (surname)

Notes

Given names derived from plants or flowers
English unisex given names